Scythris hostilis is a moth species of the family Scythrididae. It was described by Kari Nupponen in 2005. It is found in south-eastern Kazakhstan and Uzbekistan. The habitat consists of mountain steppes at elevations of 1,000-1,400 meters.

References

hostilis
Moths described in 2005
Moths of Asia